Tomb of National Heroes may refer to:

 Tomb of National Heroes, Ljubljana, a monument in Ljubljana
 Tomb of National Heroes, Zagreb, a monument in Zagreb
 Tomb of National Heroes, Belgrade, a monument in Belgrade